JSJ may refer to:

IATA code for Jiansanjiang Airport
JSJ decomposition, a process in mathematics of decomposing a topological space